Stone is a Finnish thrash metal band formed in Kerava in 1985. They released four albums and one live album during the late 1980s and early 1990s, before disbanding in 1992 to pursue different musical directions. Stone reunited to play a final set of concerts in 2000, but parted ways again soon afterwards. In 2008, Stone made five "reunion"/comeback appearances. They reunited again in March 2013 for select shows in order to promote their new box set. The band has remained active since then, and they have new material in the works.

Despite their rather short career, Stone's legacy has provided inspiration for many of the countless metal bands who emerged during the popularity explosion of the genre during the 1990s. The band's history and influence on the Finnish metal scene was detailed in the book "Stone", published in January 2018.

Children of Bodom lead guitarist Alexi Laiho credits former Stone member Roope Latvala as a major influence on his playing. Latvala himself would later join Children of Bodom as a session player, and eventually as a permanent member, after the departure of Alexander Kuoppala, and also played alongside Laiho in the now defunct Sinergy.

Members 

Current members
 Janne Joutsenniemi – bass, vocals (1985–present)

 Roope Latvala – rhythm guitar (1985–present)
 Pekka Kasari – drums (1985–present)
 Markku Niiranen – lead guitar (1990–present)
Former members
 Jiri Jalkanen – lead guitar (1985–1990)

Discography 
Studio albums
1988: Stone
1989: No Anaesthesia!
1990: Colours
1991: Emotional Playground

Live albums
1992: Free

Compilation albums
1998: Stoneage
2008: Stoneage 2.0
2013: Complete
2018: Light Entertainment – Complete Early Works

DVD
2007: Get Stoned, Stay Stoned (DVD)

Bibliography

References

External links 

 
 Stone at Encyclopaedia Metallum
 Stone on Myspace

1985 establishments in Finland
Musical groups established in 1985
Musical groups disestablished in 1992
Musical quartets
Finnish heavy metal musical groups
Finnish thrash metal musical groups
Black Mark Production artists